Zheng Saisai was the defending champion, having won the event in 2012, but decided to participate at the 2013 Nanjing Ladies Open instead.

Paula Kania won the title, defeating Zarina Diyas in the final, 6–1, 6–3.

Seeds

Main draw

Finals

Top half

Bottom half

References 
 Main draw

2013 ITF Women's Circuit